Hajla e Shkrelit is a mountain in Kosovo and Montenegro. Its location in the Hajla mountain is in the far west.

Notes and references
Notes:

References:

Mountains of Kosovo
Mountains of Montenegro
Accursed Mountains
Two-thousanders of Kosovo
Two-thousanders of Montenegro